Lillian Peacock (October 23, 1889 – August 19, 1918) was a silent film actress from Scottdale, Pennsylvania. Her real name was Lillian M. Webb.

Peacock owns more than one hundred film credits beginning with an appearance in Wanted-A Piano Tuner in 1915. Her last film efforts were Cave Man Stuff, Who's To Blame? and The Pie Eyed Piper, both from 1918.

Lillian was the first to enter the film industry but the family legacy would begin and be carried from there. 1930’s & 1940’s B Western Producer/Director Harry S. Webb, Oscar winner Ira S Webb for 1944 Phantom of the Opera, Producer Gordon Webb, Assistant Director Robert M Webb, Gordon Webb Jr, Adrienne Webb-Manhan, Chris Webb, Mark Webb, Tyler Webb, Lindsay Webb have all descended from her pioneering days in early Hollywood leading to a 6 generation film family.

Life and work 
Peacock began acting in the film studios at the age of nineteen. She worked for Universal Pictures, Pathe Pictures and Bosworth Pictures, at various times.

Peacock was severely injured in 1916 during the filming of a comedy scene in which she was to leap from one running automobile to another. Despite her injuries, she continued her career until the early part of 1918 when she became incapacitated by the effects of her injuries. She was twenty-eight years of age and had lived in Los Angeles for eleven years, after moving with her parents from Scottdale to Los Angeles. 

She died in August of that year at the home of her parents, Mr. and Mrs. S.W. Webb in Los Angeles, California. She is interred at Hollywood Cemetery.

References

American silent film actresses
People from Westmoreland County, Pennsylvania
1889 births
1918 deaths
20th-century American actresses